Wilmington station is an MBTA Commuter Rail station in Wilmington, Massachusetts served by the Lowell Line. It is located near the intersection of Main Street (Routes 38/129) and Church Street (Route 62) in Wilmington's town center. The station is accessible, with mini-high platforms serving both tracks.

Station layout and history

The Boston and Lowell Railroad originally had no intermediate stations, but Wilmington petitioned for a stop as early as 1836. An early station building was constructed either for the Andover and Wilmington Railroad in 1835 or 1836, or for the B&L and B&M a decade later. It was replaced by a small wooden structure around 1887. Both structures are still extant; the earlier structure was moved east on Church Street in the 1890s and reused as a house. The newer structure remains next to the tracks; it was converted to a pizza restaurant by 1977.

The platforms are staggered; the southbound platform is entirely to the north of the Route 62 overpass, while over half of the northbound platform is south of the bridge. A pedestrian crossing between the two platforms is located just north of the bridge; until a path from an adjacent apartment complex opened in 2015, this was the only access to the southbound platform.

The station formerly had a single small side platform and no MBTA parking lot. In 1998, the MBTA began planning a $5.2 million renovation which included longer accessible platforms and a 227-space parking lot. The project was completed in 2003 at a total cost of $13 million.

The Wildcat Branch, used by Amtrak Downeaster trains and some Haverhill Line express trains, connects with the Lowell Line at Wilmington station. The single-track branch splits from the northbound track just north of the platform. Southbound trains coming from the Wildcat Branch cannot reach the southbound platform; instead, they use the northbound platform. An interlocking south of the station allows these trains to switch onto the southbound track.

References

External links

 MBTA - Wilmington
 Station from Route 62 from Google Maps Street View

Stations along Boston and Maine Railroad lines
Buildings and structures in Wilmington, Massachusetts
MBTA Commuter Rail stations in Middlesex County, Massachusetts
Railway stations in the United States opened in 1836